{{safesubst:#invoke:RfD|||month = March
|day = 16
|year = 2023
|time = 20:33
|timestamp = 20230316203317

|content=
REDIRECT Lu Ban

}}